The Edgewater Park School District is a community public school district that serves students in grades from pre-kindergarten through eighth grade from Edgewater Park Township, in Burlington County, New Jersey, United States.

As of the 2018–19 school year, the district, comprising two schools, had an enrollment of 910 students and 76.1 classroom teachers (on an FTE basis), for a student–teacher ratio of 12.0:1.

The district is classified by the New Jersey Department of Education as being in District Factor Group "DE", the fifth-highest of eight groupings. District Factor Groups organize districts statewide to allow comparison by common socioeconomic characteristics of the local districts. From lowest socioeconomic status to highest, the categories are A, B, CD, DE, FG, GH, I and J.

For ninth through twelfth grades, public school students attend Burlington City High School in Burlington, as part of a sending/receiving relationship with the City of Burlington Public School District, in which Edgewater Park students account for nearly 40% of the high school's enrollment. As of the 2018–19 school year, the high school had an enrollment of 643 students and 73.6 classroom teachers (on an FTE basis), for a student–teacher ratio of 8.7:1.

Schools
Schools in the district (with 2018–19 enrollment data from the National Center for Education Statistics) are:
Elementary school 
Mildred Magowan Elementary School with 528 students in grades PreK-4
Amanda Fry, Principal
Middle school
Samuel M. Ridgway Middle School with 373 students in grades 5-8
Ronald Trampe, Principal

Administration
Core members of the district's administration are:
Dr. Roy A. Rakszawski, Superintendent
Nancy Lane, Business Administrator / Board Secretary

Board of education
The district's board of education, with nine members, sets policy and oversees the fiscal and educational operation of the district through its administration. As a Type II school district, the board's trustees are elected directly by voters to serve three-year terms of office on a staggered basis, with three seats up for election each year held (since 2012) as part of the November general election. The board appoints a superintendent to oversee the day-to-day operation of the district.

References

External links
Edgewater Park School District

School Data for the Edgewater Park School District, National Center for Education Statistics

Edgewater Park, New Jersey
New Jersey District Factor Group DE
School districts in Burlington County, New Jersey